Hankou North Station, is a current terminus of Line 1 of Wuhan Metro. It entered revenue service on May 28, 2014. It is located in Huangpi District.

Station layout

References

Wuhan Metro stations
Line 1, Wuhan Metro
Railway stations in China opened in 2014